Scorpion Reef is an atoll containing a small group of islets in the Gulf of Mexico, about 125 km (78 mi; 67 NM) off the northern coast of the state of Yucatán, Mexico. Designated a national park, the reef is part of the Campeche Bank archipelago and is the largest reef in the southern Gulf of Mexico. It contains five main vegetated islands: Isla Pérez, Isla Desertora, Isla Pájaros, Isla Chica, and Isla Desterrada. Isla Pérez is the only inhabited island and includes a lighthouse. The reef, including its islets and surrounding waters, has been recognised as an Important Bird Area (IBA) by BirdLife International because it supports a population of magnificent frigatebirds.

History
The British postal steamer Tweed shipwrecked in Arrecife Alacranes in 1847, with the loss of 72 lives and a cargo of mercury during a journey from Havana to Veracruz.

See also

 List of reefs

References

External links

 Website of Park

Coral reefs
Biosphere reserves of Mexico
Protected areas of Yucatán
Protected areas of Campeche
Ramsar sites in Mexico
Islands of Yucatán
Islands of Campeche
Reefs of Mexico
Islands claimed under the Guano Islands Act
Important Bird Areas of Mexico
Important Bird Areas of the Caribbean
Seabird colonies
Uninhabited islands of Mexico